This article presents official statistics gathered during the COVID-19 pandemic in mainland China.

The case count in mainland China only includes symptomatic cases. It excludes patients who test positive but do not have symptoms, of which there were 889 as of 11 February 2020. Asymptomatic infections are reported separately. It is also reported that there were more than 43,000 by the end of February 2020. On 17 April, following the Wuhan government's issuance of a report on accounting for COVID-19 deaths that occurred at home that went previously unreported, as well as the subtraction of deaths that were previously double-counted by different hospitals, the NHC retrospectively revised their cumulative totals dating to 16 April, adding 325 cumulative cases and 1,290 deaths.

Around March 2020, there was speculation that China's COVID numbers were deliberately inaccurate, but as of 2021, China's COVID elimination strategy was considered to have been successful and its statistics were considered to be accurate. 

By December 2022, the Chinese central government had changed its definition of reported death statistics to only include cases in which COVID-19 directly caused respiratory failure, which led to skepticism by health experts of the government's total death count. The same month, the municipal health chief of Qingdao reported "between 490,000 and 530,000" new COVID-19 cases per day.

China was part of a small group of countries such as Taiwan, Australia, New Zealand, and Singapore that pursued a zero-COVID strategy. The Chinese government's strategy involved extensive testing, mask wearing, temperature checks, ventilation, contact tracing, quarantines, isolation of infected people, and heavy restrictions in response to local outbreaks.

On December 25, 2022, the Chinese government's National Health Commission announced that it would no longer publish daily COVID-19 data. In January 2023, the World Health Organization stated, "We believe that the current numbers being published from China under-represent the true impact of the disease in terms of hospital admissions, in terms of ICU admissions, and particularly in terms of deaths."

Timeline

Charts

2020 cumulative and daily cases graph 
Data is from the Chinese National Health Commission.

New cases per day

Deaths per day

Recoveries per day

By province

By city

Economic Performance

Notes

References 

statistics
China